The Wallacean whistler (Pachycephala arctitorquis) is a species of bird in the family Pachycephalidae.
It is native to the eastern Lesser Sunda Islands. Its natural habitats are subtropical or tropical moist lowland forests and subtropical or tropical mangrove forests.

Subspecies
Three subspecies are recognized:
 P. a. kebirensis - Meyer, AB, 1884: Originally described as a separate species. Found on eastern Lesser Sunda Islands
 P. a. arctitorquis - Sclater, 1883: Found on Tanimbar Islands 
 P. a. tianduana - Hartert, 1901: Originally described as a separate species. Found on Tayandu Islands (southwest of New Guinea)

References

Wallacean whistler
Birds of the Lesser Sunda Islands
Birds of Wallacea
Wallacean whistler
Wallacean whistler]
Taxonomy articles created by Polbot